Subway Cycling Team was a New Zealand UCI Continental cycling team focusing on road bicycle racing mainly in Australia and New Zealand.

Team Rosters

2009 Team Roster

2010 Team Roster

2011 Team Roster

2012 Team Roster

Major wins
2009
Stage 5 Tour of Southland, Gordon McCauley
2011
Stage 5 Tour of Wellington, Westley Gough
2012
Prologue Tour de Savoie Mont Blanc, Westley Gough

World, Continental & National Champions

2010
 New Zealand Time Trial Gordon McCauley
 New Zealand Time Trial U23 Michael Vink
2011
 New Zealand Time Trial Westley Gough
2012
 New Zealand Time Trial Paul Odlin
Oceania Time Trial Samuel Horgan
Oceania Road Race Paul Odlin

References

External links
Pro Cycling Stats 

UCI Continental Teams (Oceania)
Cycling teams established in 2009